AeroUnion Flight 302, operated by an Airbus A300B4-203F cargo aircraft, crashed in poor weather on final approach at General Mariano Escobedo International Airport, Monterrey, Mexico around 23:18 CDT on 13 April 2010, after a flight from Mexico City. All five people on board were killed, as well as one on the ground.

Aircraft and crew involved
The aircraft involved was built in 1979 and after service with a number of operators was leased to Aerounión – Aerotransporte de Carga Unión in April 2002 and registered as XA-TUE. At the time of the accident, the aircraft had flown for 55,200 hours and made 27,600 landings.

The captain was 56-year-old Adolfo Muller Pazos, who had 16,754 flight hours, including 5,446 hours on the Airbus A300. The first officer was 37-year-old José Manuel Guerra, who had 3,114 flight hours, with 1,994 of them on the Airbus A300. The flight engineer was 34-year-old Humberto Castillo Vera, who had 3,038 flight hours, 1,461 of them on the Airbus A300. Also on board was an observer pilot, 25-year-old Manfred Muller, who had 206 flight hours, and 36-year-old aircraft technician Érick Guzmán.

Accident
At about 23:18 local time on 13 April (04:18 UTC on 14 April), AeroUnion Flight 302 executed a missed approach after a landing attempt and crashed The Airbus A300B4-203F was on a scheduled international freight service from Mexico City International Airport via General Mariano Escobedo International Airport, Monterrey, to Los Angeles International Airport, Los Angeles. The crew had been cleared to land the aircraft on runway 11 at Mariano Escobedo Airport, but it crashed onto the Avenida Miguel Alemán motorway, almost  short of the runway threshold. It struck a car, killing the driver. The airplane broke up and burst into flames. All five occupants of the aircraft were killed.

Investigation
The Direction General of Civil Aeronautics (DGAC) of the Ministry of Communications and Transportation of Mexico (SCT) opened an investigation into the accident. Assistance was provided by Airbus, the aircraft's manufacturer; and by France's aircraft accident investigation body, the Bureau d'Enquêtes et d'Analyses pour la Sécurité de l'Aviation Civile (BEA).
The stick shaker, stall warning and Alpha Floor protection activated and caused the engines to accelerate to maximum thrust. In response to the pitch up momentum produced by the accelerating engines the control column was pushed forward however the trim was at 10.25 degrees nose up and was not adjusted. During the last 10 seconds of flight the control column was reversed to its backward stop while the aircraft was losing height until impact.

See also
China Airlines Flight 140, another Airbus A300 that stalled on approach in Japan due to pilot error.
Colgan Air Flight 3407
Air France Flight 447
Turkish Airlines Flight 1951
United Express Flight 6291
Indonesia AirAsia Flight 8501

References

External links

 "Accident to Flight 302 on 13 April 2010 A 300-B4, registered XA-TUE." Bureau d'Enquêtes et d'Analyses pour la Sécurité de l'Aviation Civile
 "AERO UNION CARGO FLIGHT 302 ACCIDENT NEAR MONTERREY MEXICO." Airbus
 Secretariat of Communications and Transportation of Mexico
  "Comunicado de Prensa No. 055.- Inicia investigación del avión siniestrado en Nuevo León." (Archive)
  "ACCIDENTE AEREO – AIRBUS A300 B4F."

Aviation accidents and incidents in Mexico
Accidents and incidents involving the Airbus A300
Aviation accidents and incidents in 2010
2010 in Mexico
April 2010 events in Mexico